The R.S.L. Club also known as the Wyola Club or the Fremantle RSL Wyola Club Inc., is a heritage listed building located at 81-83 High Street. It was one of many commercial buildings constructed in Fremantle during the gold boom period in the late nineteenth and early twentieth century.

The building was constructed in 1903 by architect T. Anthoness. It was and built as a storefront and workshop for tailors, J.A. Hicks & Company. It was extended to designs by architects Allen & Nicholas in 1946 for the Wyola Club with further changes and restorations have been made to the building in 1955 also using the architects Allen & Nicholas.

In 2009 the building was sold to Phil Douglas, who was the manager of the Wyola Club, and his wife Linda Lyons for 482,559. The pair were later taken to court by the club concerning the sale of a property belonging to the incorporated association. The Commissioner for Consumer Protection has secured an additional 500,000 payout for members.

The building was advertised for sale in 2012 with an estimated price of 2-3 million.

See also
List of heritage places in Fremantle

References

High Street, Fremantle
Heritage places in Fremantle
1903 establishments in Australia
State Register of Heritage Places in the City of Fremantle